HD 85622 is a binary star system in the southern constellation of Vela. It is visible to the naked eye with an apparent visual magnitude of 4.58. It is moving further from the Earth with a heliocentric radial velocity of +8 km/s.

This is a single-lined spectroscopic binary with a circular orbit and a period of 329.3 days. This value provides a lower bound on the actual semimajor axis.

The visible component is a supergiant star with a stellar classification of G5 Ib or G6 IIa. It is about 64 million years old with a projected rotational velocity of 19 km/s. The star has 6.2 times the mass of the Sun and is radiating 1,908 times the Sun's luminosity from its photosphere at an effective temperature of 4,796 K.

References

G-type supergiants
Spectroscopic binaries
Vela (constellation)
Velorum, m
Durchmusterung objects
085622
048374
3912